Arkadiusz Baran (born November 9, 1979) is a Polish football player who currently plays for Stal Rzeszów.

Career
Before coming to Kraków, he had also played for such teams as Jaroslaw JKS, Polonia Przemyśl and Stal Rzeszów. He is a defensive midfielder, a tough fighter, who does not refrain from fouling opponents for which is often punished with yellow or red cards.

References

External links
 
 Arkadiusz Baran in KS Cracovia online encyclopedia

1979 births
Living people
Polish footballers
JKS 1909 Jarosław players
MKS Cracovia (football) players
Polonia Warsaw players
Zagłębie Lubin players
Bruk-Bet Termalica Nieciecza players
People from Jarosław
Sportspeople from Podkarpackie Voivodeship
Association football midfielders
Stal Rzeszów players